Xi'an University of Architecture and Technology (XUAT) is a joint venture between the People's Government of Shaanxi Province, the Ministry of Housing and Urban-Rural Development of the People's Republic of China and the Ministry of Education. "It is one of the key universities directly under the former Ministry of Metallurgical Industry, the national "Central and Western Universities Basic Capacity Building Project", the national "Key Discipline Project", the high level university in Shaanxi Province, the first batch of doctoral and master's degree universities in China. and bachelor's degree authorizing units, selected in the 111 Plan, the first batch of the National Cultivation Program for Excellent Engineer Education, the National Base for International Science and Technology Cooperation, the National Master of Engineering Graduate Education Innovation College, and the National Public Postgraduate Program for the Construction of High-level Universities. It is a multi-disciplinary university featuring civil engineering, environment and municipal administration, materials metallurgy and other related disciplines, with engineering and technology disciplines as the main subjects.
In 1956, when the faculties and departments of higher education institutions were adjusted for the third time, the school was formed from the former Northeast Institute of Technology, Northwest Institute of Technology, Qingdao Institute of Technology and the Department of Architecture, Civil Engineering and Municipal Engineering of Sunan Institute of Technology, then named Xi'an Institute of Architectural Engineering. College of Architecture.In March 1994, approved by the former State Education Commission, the name was changed to Xi'an University of Architecture and Technology.The Graduate School was established in 2011. 
As of September 2019, the school Yanta, Cottage Campus and Huaqing Science and Education Industrial Park cover a total area of more than 4,300 acres; there are 20 colleges and 63 undergraduate majors; there are 9 post-doctoral mobile stations, 9 first-discipline doctoral points, 26 first-discipline master's points, and 16 master's degree categories; there are more than 2,800 teaching staff, including more than 1,700 full-time teachers and 3 full-time academicians; students More than 34,000 people.

History
In 1895, the Department of Civil Engineering of Beiyang University, which was established in the 21st year of Qing Guangxu, the Department of Civil Engineering of Qingdao University of Technology, which was established in 1952 (its predecessor was the Department of Civil Engineering of Shandong University Hall, which was established in 1901), and the Department of Civil Engineering and the Department of Architectural Arts of Suzhou Industrial College, which was established in Jiangsu Province in 1911 (the first major of architecture in the history of China's specialist education), were merged to form Xi'an College of Architectural Engineering in the early days of the merger.
During the third national faculty reorganization in 1956, the Department of Civil Engineering and Department of Architecture of Northeastern University (the first undergraduate architecture department in the history of Chinese higher education), which was founded in 1923 and 1928, was merged with the Department of Civil Engineering of Northwest Polytechnic in 1938 (Northwest Polytechnic was formed by the merger of the engineering colleges of Beiyang University, Beiping University, Northeastern University and Jiaozuo Polytechnic, which were moved to Shaanxi at the beginning of the war), which was the first undergraduate architecture institution of higher learning in Northwest China. 
In 1959, the name was changed to Xi'an Metallurgical Institute.
In 1963, the name was changed to Xi'an Institute of Metallurgy and Architecture. 
In November 1981, approved by the State Council, the university became one of the first units in China to award doctoral and master's degrees.
On March 8, 1994, the name was changed for the third time to Xi'an University of Architecture and Technology with the approval of the Ministry of Education.
In 1998, the university was transferred to the People's Government of Shaanxi Province for management.
In 2010, the university was honored as "National University with Typical Experience in Graduate Employment" by the Ministry of Education, selected as the first batch of "Cultivation Plan for Excellent Engineer Education" by the Ministry of Education, awarded as "National Innovative University for Postgraduate Engineering Education", and selected as the university for the construction of "National Key Subject Project". 
In September 2011, the Graduate School of Xi'an University of Architecture and Technology was established.   By the end of the same year, it was selected for the national construction of high-level university public postgraduate program.
In November 2019, the traditional tile-making technique inheritance base of Xi'an University of Architecture and Technology was selected in the 2019 National List of Inheritance Bases of Chinese Excellent Traditional Culture for Ordinary Universities.

Academic development
As of May 2018, the school has 3 national key disciplines, 18 provincial key disciplines, 7 postdoctoral mobile stations, 9 doctoral programs in first-level disciplines and 31 doctoral programs in second-level disciplines, 25 master's programs in first-level disciplines and 95 master's programs in second-level disciplines, and master's programs basically cover all undergraduate majors in the school.  In the fourth round of national discipline evaluation in 2016, five disciplines of architecture, urban and rural planning, landscape architecture, civil engineering, environmental science and engineering were B+ (top 20% of the country); materials science and engineering were B (top 30% of the country); management science and engineering were B− (top 40% of the country); engineering entered the top 1% of ESI global ranking in November 2016.
Doctoral Degrees in first-class disciplines (9): materials science and engineering, civil engineering, architecture, environmental science and engineering, urban and rural planning, landscape architecture, management science and engineering, mechanical engineering, metallurgical engineering.
As of 2014, the university has one national technology research and promotion center, one national and local joint engineering research center, one national key laboratory cultivation base, one national technology transfer demonstration institution, three national Class A design research institutes, four key laboratories and engineering research centers of the Ministry of Education, two laboratories and research centers of the Ministry of Housing and Urban-Rural Development, one sports and culture center of the General Administration of Sport of China, and one national research center of the Ministry of Education. Research base, 5 key laboratories in Shaanxi Province, 14 engineering technology (research) centers in Shaanxi Province, 1 key research base for philosophical and social sciences in Shaanxi Province universities, Shaanxi Province Circular Economy Engineering and Technology Institute relies on the school to establish.

See also
Xu Delong, former president

References

External links
'Xi'an University of Architecture and Technology Official site.

 
Universities and colleges in Xi'an
Educational institutions established in 1895
1895 establishments in China